Arthur Fischer (2 November 1897 – 3 December 1991) was a Swedish actor. He appeared in more than 90 films between 1933 and 1977.

Selected filmography

 Augusta's Little Misstep (1933)
 The Count of the Old Town (1935)
 The Boys of Number Fifty Seven (1935)
 The Andersson Family (1937)
 Mother Gets Married (1937)
 Hotel Paradise (1937)
 Baldwin's Wedding (1938)
 Storm Over the Skerries (1938)
 Whalers (1939)
 Bashful Anton (1940)
 Goransson's Boy (1941)
 The Ghost Reporter (1941)
 Sun Over Klara (1942)
 The Yellow Clinic (1942)
 Tomorrow's Melody (1942)
 Skipper Jansson (1944)
Widower Jarl (1945)
 The Österman Brothers' Virago (1945)
 Between Brothers (1946)
 Kvarterets olycksfågel (1947)
 Rail Workers (1947)
 The People of Simlang Valley (1947)
 Two Women (1947)
 Carnival Evening (1948)
 Dangerous Spring (1949)
 The Devil and the Smalander (1949)
 Big Lasse of Delsbo (1949)
 Father Bom (1949)
 The Realm of the Rye (1950)
Living on 'Hope' (1951)
 Skipper in Stormy Weather (1951)
 In Lilac Time (1952)
 Kalle Karlsson of Jularbo (1952)
 Speed Fever (1953)
 Ursula, the Girl from the Finnish Forests (1953)
Taxi 13 (1954)
 Simon the Sinner (1954)
 The Biscuit (1956)
 The Song of the Scarlet Flower (1956)
 The Halo Is Slipping (1957)
 Fridolf Stands Up! (1958)
 We at Väddö (1958)
 Heart's Desire (1960)
 Sten Stensson Returns (1963)

References

External links

1897 births
1991 deaths
Swedish male film actors
Male actors from Stockholm